Camp Timanous is a historic boys' summer camp in Raymond, Maine, United States. It offers a "traditional" program of land and water activities, aimed at developing "Body, Mind, and Spirit".  Camp Timanous is both a progenitor of the Maine sleepaway camping tradition and industry and is one of the oldest continually operating summer camps in America. Across Maine in a typical summer, some 40,000 children participate in youth summer programs, mostly at one of Maine's 200 licensed summer camps, such as Camp Timanous.

History
Timanous was founded in 1887 in Connecticut by American physical fitness education pioneer Luther Halsey Gulick (1865–1918), who also founded the Camp Fire Girls in 1910 and was instrumental in the development of the YMCA, basketball, and volleyball. In 1920, Gulick moved the boys' camp to the current Raymond, Maine, location on Panther Pond, a large offshoot of Sebago Lake.

The name "Timanous" derives from the Indian name Gulick was known by, meaning "Guiding Spirit." In 1907, Gulick founded a sister camp, Wohelo, with which Timanous interacts through dances, swim meets and various races.

John (Johnny) and Martha (Marti) Suitor purchased the camp from the Gulick family and began operating it in 1942. In the early 1980s, the Suitors' two sons, Jack and David, became directors. Camp Timanous is currently owned and operated by David and Linda Suitor, who became active directors in 1983.

Staff, campers, and counselors have a very high return rate. In 2006, 93% of the 50 counseling staff were former campers, averaging over 10 years at camp (12 were teachers). There is no indoor plumbing nor electricity in living quarters at Timanous.

Facilities and campus
Intended for boys aged 7 to 15, the summer is divided into two three-and-a-half-week-long sessions, and many campers choose to attend both. There are typically around 125 campers at camp at any given point in the summer.

Campers live in either one of the 10 wooden cabins (otherwise known as "bunks"), a large tent or a waterside structure called "The Nest". There is no electricity or running water in any of the cabins; standard plumbing-equipped outhouses are spread along the bunkline. Campers are grouped by age. Cabins are named after birds, such as mallards or crows.

Program

Sports and activities 
At the outset, the Timanous daily program served as a model for Gulick to originate and "test" ideas later implemented in the Camp Fire program, helping form the traditional notions of American camping. In a typical day at today's camp, campers participate in both instructional and recreational activity; options include baseball, tennis, soccer, running, sailing, canoeing and boating, water skiing, handicrafts, woodshop, riflery, climbing wall and archery.

Camping trips and camp events
Camp Timanous offers a variety of camping trips throughout Maine and New Hampshire, including trips to the White Mountains, Mount Washington, and Sebago Lake. Every cabin goes on one trip per summer, ranging from one to three days, and optional sign-up trips are available to the eldest five cabins. These trips usually consist of hiking or canoeing, but occasionally include rafting, biking, backpacking and kayaking.

Several times during the summer, the regular schedule is suspended for popular camp-wide games of capture the flag.  Campers and counselors are divided into two teams, green and gray. Each camper's association with a team color is permanent, and each new arrival to Timanous with alumni relatives is automatically assigned to the relatives' former team.

On the 4th of July, the entire camp builds a bonfire. It is part of the annual, camp-wide celebration of the American Independence Day, and is often attended by Timanous alumni.

Sharing a common heritage although under different ownership today, Timanous and Wohelo have a long history of interacting all summer long. The camps hold dances and swim meets, as well as organize a "brother-sister day", during which Wohelo and Timanous campers with siblings at the opposite camp will spend a couple of hours together.

Council Fire
Council Fire follows every Sunday dinner. The entire camp congregates at a specific site to recognize the achievements of the past week, including awards earned and good deeds done. This tradition dates back to the earliest summers at Timanous.

Chapel
Six times a summer, on Sunday mornings, the entire camp gathers for chapel, a brief service of reflection and consideration that offers time for quiet thought punctuated by both traditional and contemporary songs.

Annually during the summer, all Timanous campers and staff visit Wohelo for an inter-camp gathering and service in remembrance, recognition and appreciation of the lives of their mutual founders,  Luther Halsey and his wife, Charlotte Vetter Gulick. This event often serves as an informal alumni reunion for past Timanous and Wohelo campers and counselors.

Watersports
On the morning of the final day of the summer, the camp is again split into the two green and gray teams, and the campers participate in Watersports Day, a final competition between the two colors, with events including war canoe, kayak and swim races.

Culture

The commitment to "Body, Mind, and Spirit" remains best identified with the Timanous "T", a triangular emblem. Each corner of the triangle represents one of the three ideals that Camp Timanous is based around.

While recent years have updated and diversified the camper uniform, the basic elements have been maintained since the early 20th century. The Timanous colors, green and grey, are on the uniforms and also represent the two teams for occasional camp-wide activities that resemble a color war.

Notable alumni
Chris Beam, author
Peter Gammons, sports writer and ESPN personality
Porter J. Goss, former Director of the CIA
Luther H. Gulick, camping, basketball, volleyball and physical education innovator
Mark Herzlich, college football All-American and linebacker for the New York Giants
Karl N. Llewellyn, scholar and proponent of American legal realism
Samuel Pickering, author and professor
Peter Suber, American philosopher and director of the Harvard Office for Scholarly Communication
Thomas Meaney, writer
Samuel Holden Jaffe, musician professionally known as Del Water Gap

References

External links
Timanous' website
Maine Youth Camping Association

Timanous
Buildings and structures in Cumberland County, Maine
Raymond, Maine